Carex hakonensis, also known as small-needle sedge, is a tussock-forming species of perennial sedge in the family Cyperaceae. It is native to Japan and Korea.

See also
List of Carex species

References

hakonensis
Taxa named by Adrien René Franchet
Taxa named by Ludovic Savatier
Plants described in 1878
Flora of Japan
Flora of Korea